A Genius, Two Partners and a Dupe is a 1975 Spaghetti Western comedy film directed by Damiano Damiani and Sergio Leone, who directed the opening scene.

Plot
Joe Thanks (Terence Hill) is a genius conman. He conducts various schemes with his two friends: Half-breed Steam Engine Bill (Robert Charlebois) and his girlfriend Lucy (Miou-Miou). Lucy loves both men, and they in turn both vie for her affection.

Joe formulates an extremely elaborate plan to steal $300,000 from Major Cabot (Patrick McGoohan), an Indian-hating cavalry man, and in doing so save the Indian land he is trying to steal. Every time the plan seems to be failing, Joe has another trick up his sleeve. The film climaxes with a stagecoach chase and a gigantic explosion.

Cast
Terence Hill as Joe Thanks
Miou-Miou as Lucy / Lilla
Patrick McGoohan as Major Cabot / Harris
Robert Charlebois as Steam Train Bill / Paul Lambet
Klaus Kinski as Doc Foster
Jean Martin as Colonel Pembroke
Miriam Mahler as Colonel Pembroke's daughter
Raimund Harmstorf as Sergeant Milton
Benito Stefanelli as Mortimer
Pietro Vida as Jerry / Jelly Roll
Roy Bosier as Jeremy
Frederick Ledebur as Don Felipe
Renato Baldini as Sheriff
Mario Brega as Krutscher
Lina Franchi as Mary Gomez
Mario Valgoi as Thomas
Rik Battaglia as Captain
Pietro Torrisi as Mortimer henchman
Gerard Boucaron as Town idiot
Elio Angelucci as Brothel man

Production
Parts of the film were shot at the San Juan River and Monument Valley in Utah.

Release
A Genius, Two Partners and a Dupe was released in West Germany on December 16, 1975 as Nobody ist der Größte.

The movie was also released in English under four different titles:

 A Genius, Two Partners and a Dupe
 A Genius, Two Friends and an Idiot
 Trinity is Back Again
 Nobody's the Greatest

These different titles feature lightly different scenarios, or longer scenes.
This was due to the fact that some of the best footage was stolen, and the director refusing to pay the ransom.
They had to re-shoot some scenes but lacked the time for some of them. Consequently, it became impossible to edit the movie with perfect coherence.

References

External links
 

1975 films
1970s Western (genre) comedy films
Films about con artists
Films directed by Damiano Damiani
Films directed by Sergio Leone
Spaghetti Western films
Films scored by Ennio Morricone
Films shot in Utah
Films shot in Almería
Films with screenplays by Ernesto Gastaldi
English-language French films
English-language German films
English-language Italian films
Italian Western (genre) comedy films
1975 comedy films
1970s Italian films
Foreign films set in the United States